Ruth Wilkinson is a fictional character from the Australian soap opera Neighbours, played by Ailsa Piper. She made her first appearance during the episode broadcast on 3 October 1996. Ruth was introduced as Helen Daniels' (Anne Haddy) physiotherapist. She was a divorced single mother, who later established a relationship with Philip Martin (Ian Rawlings), which attracted some opposition from their children. The relationship was later tested by the introduction of Ruth's long lost son, Ben Atkins (Brett Cousins) and his father Geoff Burke (Andrew McKaige). Philip and Ruth marry in 1998, amid a breast cancer scare for Ruth. The Martin family were written out of Neighbours and they departed together on 20 October 1999. Piper reprised her role for the show's 20th anniversary episode, which aired on 27 July 2005.

Casting
Piper was an established theatre actress and had not acted in television until she joined the cast of Neighbours in 1996. Piper was considered for the role of Susan Kennedy before she was cast as Ruth, a new love interest for Philip Martin (Ian Rawlings).

In September 1999, Inside Soap reported that the Martin family had been written out of Neighbours and that they had already filmed their final scenes. Piper revealed that she had expected to leave after her first two-year contract ended and the extra time had been a bonus. Piper added that filming her final scenes was very emotional. In April 2005, Piper reprised her role as Ruth for Neighbours''' 20th anniversary episode, which aired in July 2005.

Development
Ruth was a Physiotherapist who arrives in Ramsay Street to care for Helen Daniels (Anne Haddy). Ruth was a single mother to Lance (Andrew Bibby) and Anne (Brooke Satchwell) and the Illawarra Mercury said Piper's role allowed her to "portray the non-traditional family unit in a positive light." When asked in what ways she was similar to her character, Piper told The Sydney Morning Herald, "We share the same legs and the same quick temper." Ruth gets on well with Helen, but not with her grandson-in-law, Philip (Ian Rawlings). However, when her ex-husband, Bill Hails (Ian Stanley Pearce), appeared, Philip becomes a "useful ally." Phil becomes nervous about asking Ruth out and he is "egged on" by Helen who plays matchmaker. The Daily Record said "the makers of Neighbours can stretch out this relationship for several episodes before we have a clear idea if it's actually going anywhere." Lance later catches Ruth and Philip sharing a secret kiss and they begin a relationship. The BBC said Ruth and Philip's relationship was "no picnic" and their children took time getting used to it. Philip's youngest daughter, Hannah (Rebecca Ritters), resents Ruth until they have a heart to heart talk.

Ruth and Philip also had to cope with her long lost son, Ben (Brett Cousins) and his father, Geoff (Andrew McKaige), arriving in town. Piper told the Illawarra Mercury that she would never forget the moment producers told her that she was going to have a 21-year-old son and that her character had been pregnant at 16, which she had kept hidden. Ben comes to Ramsay Street to meet Ruth and Piper said it was "the first time we ever saw Ruth's character as anything but a bright and sunny person." Piper also revealed that uncovering new things about her character led to "really meaty scenes." Ben's arrival won an AFI Award and Piper said the episode was "beautifully written" and she and Cousins were allowed to feed the characters and not just the plot. Ben is later involved in a major car accident and he is left in a coma, which is a testing time for Ruth. Ben goes on to recover.

Ruth and Philip get engaged and Piper said while it was an exciting change for her character, she loved being a single parent. Ruth and Philip marry, whilst Ruth anxiously waits for results of tests for breast cancer. Ruth is determined to go ahead with the wedding and Piper said "This is her big day and she wants it to be just right. However, as she doesn't have her results, there is the thought at the back of her mind that the news might not be good. She's doing her best not to think about it." Ruth arrives at the ceremony on the back of a classic Harley Davidson motorbike and she is "thrilled" to see Ben and Philip's son, Michael (Troy Beckwith), have returned for the wedding. Piper said that there is an atmosphere of madness, happiness and excitement to the day. Ruth later discovers that she does not have cancer. After Philip has a mid-life crisis, he decides to move the family to Darwin. Ruth initially considers commuting thousands of miles, but ultimately chooses to follow her husband when she gets a top job at a Darwin hospital.

Storylines
Ruth became pregnant to her boyfriend Geoff Burke when she was sixteen. She gave birth to a son, who she named Christopher. Ruth's parents advised her to place Christopher for adoption. He was later adopted by the Atkins family and renamed Ben. Ruth went on to marry Bill Hails and they had twins, Anne and Lance. Bill and Ruth later divorce and Lance chooses to live with Ruth, while Anne stays with Bill.

Ruth comes to Erinsborough to work as Helen Daniels' physiotherapist. Ruth clashes with Philip Martin and after an argument, Ruth is fired. Philip changes his mind after seeing how her departure affects Helen. Philip accompanies Ruth to retrieve her car from Bill and he offers to rent a house to her. Ruth and Philip discover Lance and Hannah are dating and it causes friction between them. The tension between Ruth and Philip comes to a head on Christmas Day when they kiss. Ruth and Philip become a couple despite opposition from their children. When Ben arrives in Ramsay Street, and moves in next door to Ruth, she becomes worried about the amount of time he is spending with Lance and Anne, who had since move to Ramsay Street. Ben confesses to Ruth that he is the son she gave up and after an emotional conversation, Ruth builds up a relationship with Ben.

Ruth and Philip break up and Ruth decides to leave Erinsborough. Anne and Lance try to convince her to stay and Ruth relents. She takes a job at Karl Kennedy's (Alan Fletcher) surgery and has a short-lived relationship with Alistair O'Connor (Michael O'Neill). Helen dies and Ruth and Philip become close again. Philip suggests that Ruth, Lance and Anne move in with him and Hannah, but she is not keen on living together out of wedlock. During Ben's race at Calder Park Raceway, Philip proposes to Ruth, but before she can accept, Ben has a car crash. He is rushed to hospital and is left in a coma but later recovers. Ben's father, Geoff, arrives, which shocks Ruth and she warns him that his presence could set Ben's recovery back. Ben decides to move away with Geoff, which devastates Ruth.

Ruth accepts Philip's proposal, but before the wedding, she finds a lump in her breast. She and Philip bring the wedding forward and Ben and Philip's son, Michael, return. On the day of the wedding, Ruth is brought to Lassiter's Lake on the back of a motorcycle. At the reception, Ruth receives a phone call telling her that she is in remission. Ruth, Lance and Anne then move in with Philip and Hannah. Ruth and Hannah clash constantly, but after talking things through, they start to get on better. Ruth starts exhibiting strange behaviour and when Hannah spots her hugging Bill, she thinks they having an affair. Ruth reveals that Bill has been left bankrupt by his new wife and she has been lending him money. Lance develops a gambling addiction and sells Ruth's fob watch. Ruth supports her son when he agrees to attend Gamblers Anonymous.

Philip gets a job in Darwin, but Ruth is reluctant to leave. They eventually decide on moving to Darwin, but have a hard time convincing Hannah to go with them. Hannah eventually agrees to go and the Martins say goodbye to their friends. A few years later, Ruth appears in Annalise Hartman's (Kimberly Davies) documentary about Ramsay Street.

Reception
Marion McMullen of the Coventry Telegraph said Piper had some "meaty" storylines during her three years on Neighbours. She also said Ruth had "certainly been through the mill" with "a messy divorce, a cancer scare, a resentful rebellious daughter and the reappearance of a long-lost son that she'd placed for adoption when he was just a baby." McMullen added that Ruth was a "super-mum." The BBC said Ruth's most notable moment was "Sharing a secret Christmas kiss with Philip." Tina Baker said Ruth was a "much loved" character. In 1999, viewers voted Ruth the third "Best female over 30" in the Neighbours.com Awards. Brian Courtis and Andrew Ryan of The Age'' said there would be "some sad faces around the box" when Ruth, Philip and Hannah departed.

References

External links
 Ruth Wilkinson at the BBC
 Ruth Wilkinson at Neighbours.com

Neighbours characters
Television characters introduced in 1996
Fictional medical personnel
Female characters in television
Fictional teenage parents